Kim Joon-beom (born 14 January 1998) is a South Korean footballer who plays as a midfielder for Gimcheon Sangmu.

Career
Before the start of the 2018 K League 1 season, Kim joined Gyeongnam FC together with his brother Kim Joon-seon.

References

1998 births
Living people
People from Mokpo
Association football midfielders
South Korean footballers
South Korea under-23 international footballers
Gyeongnam FC players
Incheon United FC players
Gimcheon Sangmu FC players
K League 1 players
K League 2 players
Yonsei University alumni